Yad Binyamin (lit. Binyamin Memorial) is a community settlement in central Israel. The seat of Nahal Sorek Regional Council, it is located adjacent to the junction of three major highways: Highway 3, Highway 6, and Highway 7.

History

Yad Binyamin was founded on the land of the depopulated Palestinian village of Al-Mukhayzin. The land had been used as a Ma'abara Nativa which was abandoned as a religious settlement and educational center in 1962 by Poalei Agudat Yisrael, in partnership with the municipality of Nahal Sorek. It was named after the former Minister of Postal Services, Binyamin Mintz, who had died the previous year. For many years, the community was a center of higher Jewish learning, based around the yeshiva.

Following the disengagement plan, around 200 families from Gush Katif moved into temporary pre-fabricated housing in Yad Binyamin. Some later moved to a new village named Ganei Tal after the former settlement by the same name.  Many other families have moved to Netzer Hazani.

Transportation
In September 2018, Israel Railways opened the nearby Kiryat Malachi-Yoav station, connecting the area to the Nahariyah–Beersheba line. A number of Egged bus routes provide transport links to Jerusalem, Ashkelon, and other cities.

References

External links

Community settlements
Religious Israeli communities
Populated places established in 1962
1962 establishments in Israel
Populated places in Central District (Israel)